The FC Denzlingen is a German association football club from the city of Denzlingen, Baden-Württemberg.

The club's most notable achievements are playing in the highest football league in the state, the Oberliga Baden-Württemberg, from 1999 to 2002 and again in 2009–10. It also reached the first round of the German Cup once, in 1998.

History
The FC Denzlingen was formed on 7 January 1928. From 1947, when it returned to competitive football after the war, to 1951, the club was known as SV Denzlingen.

The club did not make an impact on the football scene in South Baden until 1988, when it earned promotion to the tier-five Landesliga through a championship in the Bezirksliga Freiburg. FCD managed another promotion within two season, now to the Verbandsliga Südbaden, where it lasted for only one season.

In 1993, it made a more permanent return to the Verbandsliga. In 1998, it took out the South Baden Cup, which qualified the club for the first round of the national cup competition. There, on 29 August 1998 it met Hamburger SV and earned a respectable 3–0 defeat against the Fußball-Bundesliga team. The season proved to get even more successful when the club took out the league title and earned promotion to the Oberliga Baden-Württemberg for the first time.

At this level, the team struggled for three seasons, a twelfth place its best result, before being relegated again. FCD did not settle well back in the Verbandsliga and was relegated once more in 2004.

Its stint in the Landesliga was however only a short one, returning to the Verbandsliga immediately on the strength of a league championship. The club also reached the South Baden Cup final once more in 2005, but lost.

In 2008–09, the team had another successful season, winning promotion back to the Oberliga for a second stint, but lasted for only one season before going down again. After finishing second-last in the Verbandsliga in 2014–15 the club was relegated to the Landesliga but bounced back immediately through a league championship there.

Honours
The club's honours:

League
 Verbandsliga Südbaden (V-VI)
 Champions: 1999, 2009
 Landesliga Südbaden-Staffel II (V-VI)
 Champions: 1990, 2005, 2016
 Bezirksliga Freiburg (VI)
 Champions: 1988

Cup
 South Baden Cup
 Winners: 1998
 Runners-up: 2006

Recent managers
Recent managers of the club:

Recent seasons
The recent season-by-season performance of the club:

 With the introduction of the Regionalligas in 1994 and the 3. Liga in 2008 as the new third tier, below the 2. Bundesliga, all leagues below dropped one tier.

References

External links
Official team site
FC Denzlingen profile at Weltfussball.de
Das deutsche Fußball-Archiv historical German domestic league tables 

Football clubs in Germany
Football clubs in Baden-Württemberg
Association football clubs established in 1928
1928 establishments in Germany